The Curse of Turandot is a 2021 Chinese romantic fantasy film directed by Zheng Xiaolong and starring Guan Xiaotong, Dylan Sprouse, Hu Jun, Lin Siyi, Collin Chou, and Wang Jia. The Curse of Turandot premiered in China on 15 October 2021.

Cast
 Guan Xiaotong as Turandot, princess of the Great Khanate.
 Ulantoya Do as Little Turandot
 Dylan Sprouse as Calaf, an orphan who falls in love with Turandot.
 Hu Jun as General Boyan.
 Lin Siyi as Liu Er
 Collin Chou as Zhou Da
 Wang Jia as Prince Wutong
 Jiang Wen as Khan, father of Turandot.
 Sophie Marceau as Queen of Malvia
 Vincent Perez as King of Malvia

Release
The Curse of Turandot was released in China on 15 October 2021.

References

External links

2021 films
2021 fantasy films
2020s Mandarin-language films
2020s romantic fantasy films
Chinese romantic fantasy films
Films scored by Simon Franglen
Films based on fantasy novels
Films based on works by Carlo Gozzi
Works based on Turandot (Gozzi)